Jacob Boy Mamabolo is a South African politician from Limpopo who serves as a Member of the National Assembly of South Africa. He was elected to Parliament at the 2019 general election. Mamabolo is a member of the African National Congress.

Early life
Mamabolo hails from Masakeng, Seshego. He and current Economic Freedom Fighters president Julius Malema grew up in the same community and both became involved in the same organisations. Both were members of the Congress of South African Students (COSAS) and the African National Congress Youth League (ANCYL). He was the COSAS provincial secretary when Malema was the organisation's national president. Their friendship ended while they were active in the ANCYL. Mamabolo was a supporter of former ANC president Jacob Zuma while Malema turned on Zuma.

Parliamentary career
Mamabolo was placed second on the ANC's regional list for the May 2019 general election. At the election, he was elected as an MP. As of June 2019, he sits on both the Portfolio Committee on Sports, Arts and Culture and the Standing Committee on the Auditor-General.

Incidents
When Malema was suspended as youth league president in 2011, Mamabolo burnt a mock coffin in celebration. In 2013, he was involved in a court battle with Malema after he sent him a message threatening to exhume his mother's remains and take it to his grandmother's house. In the same year, Mamabolo was arrested on fraud charges relating to his tenure as the chairperson of the Limpopo Geographical Names Committee.

2020 State of the Nation Address
While EFF MPs disrupted the 2020 annual State of the Nation Address, Mamabolo rose on a point of order and said:

In the subsequent debate, he once again accused Malema of domestic abuse. Consequently, Malema and his spouse approached the Limpopo High Court and filed lawsuits of R1 million each, citing defamation. The two parties reached an out-of-court agreement wherein Mamabolo apologised, saying that his utterances were "uncalled for".

In 2020, Mamabolo was condemned by the South African National Editors Forum for violent threats against a journalist.

Mamabolo was reported in 2022 to have made a veiled death threat to an editor via WhatsApp message as part of demanding a let up in coverage of a presidential aide.

References

External links
Jacob Boy Mamabolo – People's Assembly
Mr Jacob Boy Mamabolo – Parliament of South Africa

Living people
Year of birth missing (living people)
People from Polokwane
People from Limpopo
African National Congress politicians
Members of the National Assembly of South Africa
21st-century South African politicians